James Maitland, 7th Earl of Lauderdale (25 January 1718 – 17 August 1789), and was one of the sixteen representative peers for Scotland in the House of Lords.

Life
James Maitland was born the eldest son of Charles Maitland, 6th Earl of Lauderdale (the second but eldest surviving son of John Maitland, 5th Earl of Lauderdale and Lady Margaret Cunningham) and Lady Elizabeth Ogilvy, daughter of James Ogilvy, 4th Earl of Findlater and Anne Dunbar.

He served for twenty-five years in the army; and was appointed Lieutenant-colonel of the 16th Regiment of Foot on 20 September 1745. He resigned his commission upon the promotion of a junior officer above him.

He was also unlucky under the Heritable Jurisdictions (Scotland) Act 1746 which abolished heritable jurisdictions, when he got for the Regality of Thirlestane and bailiary of Lauderdale £1000, instead of the £8000 he claimed.

He was a Lord of Police from February 1766 until the abolition of that board in 1782; and Rector of the University of Glasgow from 1779 to 1781.

Lord Lauderdale died at Haltoun House.

Family
On 24 April 1749 he married Mary Turner (d. 1789), only child and heiress of Sir Thomas de Lombe, Knt., Alderman of the City of London, by whom he obtained a large fortune. They had twelve children, 6 boys and 6 girls.

His son and heir, James Maitland, 8th Earl of Lauderdale began his career as a revolutionary in France and later made a name for himself as one of Britain's leading economic thinkers, who first identified the economic significance and effect on economic growth of budget surpluses and deficits. This thinking was later developed and systematised by Lord Keynes. The third son was Lieutenant-General Sir Thomas Maitland, GCB, GCH (1759–1824), governor and commander-in-chief at Ceylon, then of Malta and the Ionian Islands.

References
 Douglas, Sir Robert, The Peerage, vol. ii, p. 76.
 Burke, Messrs. John and John Bernard, The Royal Families of England, Scotland, and Wales, with their Descendants, etc., London, 1851, vol. 2, pedigree LXXXIV.
 Lodge, Edmund, Norroy King of Arms, The Peerage of the British Empire, 27th edition, London, 1858, p. 339.
 Anderson, William, The Scottish Nation, Edinburgh, 1867, vol. vi, p. 637.

1718 births
1789 deaths
Scottish soldiers
Maitland, James
Rectors of the University of Glasgow
Scottish representative peers